Sebaceous nevus syndrome is a cutaneous condition and may resemble CHILD syndrome.

See also 
 Sebaceous hyperplasia
 List of cutaneous conditions

References 

Epidermal nevi, neoplasms, and cysts